Slayers is a 2022 American comedy horror film, written, produced and directed by K. Asher Levin. It stars Thomas Jane, Kara Hayward, Jack Donnelly, Lydia Hearst, Malin Akerman, and Abigail Breslin. The film was released in theaters and digitally on October 21, 2022, by The Avenue Entertainment.

Premise 
A group of online superstar influencers are invited to a reclusive billionaire's mansion only to find themselves trapped in the lair of an evil vampire. Their only way out is to be saved by a famous online gamer and an old school vampire hunter.

Cast
 Thomas Jane as Elliot Jones
 Kara Hayward as Flynn
 Jack Donnelly as Jack Chambers
 Lydia Hearst as Liz Andrews
 Ash T as David Dean 
 Malin Akerman as Beverly Rektor
 Abigail Breslin as Jules

Production
In June 2020, it was announced that Kara Hayward, Lydia Hearst, and Jack Donnelly had joined the cast of the horror film With Teeth, with K. Asher Levin directing from a screenplay he wrote, and serving as a producer, with Malin Akerman set to executive produce and eyeing a key role. In September 2020, the film was retitled Slayers, and Abigail Breslin, Åkerman, and Thomas Jane joined the cast, with Breslin serving as a producer and Jane as an executive producer.

Principal photography began in November 2020 in Albuquerque, New Mexico.

References

External links
 

2022 comedy horror films
American comedy horror films
American vampire films
Films shot in New Mexico
Vampire comedy films
Films about social media